

Arthropods

Newly named insects

Archosauromorphs

Newly named diapsids

Newly named dinosaurs
Data courtesy of George Olshevsky's dinosaur genera list.

Newly named birds

Newly named Pterosaurs

References

 
Paleontology
Paleontology 0